The FIL World Luge Championships 1993 took place in Calgary, Alberta, Canada for the second time, having previously hosted the event in 1990.

Men's singles

Suckow is the first American to win a championship at the World or Winter Olympic level.

Women's singles

Weissensteiner was the last non-German to win in the event at the World championships until American Erin Hamlin won her gold in 2009.

Men's doubles

Mixed team

Medal table

References
Men's doubles World Champions
Men's singles World Champions
Mixed teams World Champions
Women's singles World Champions

FIL World Luge Championships
1993 in luge
1993 in Canadian sports
International luge competitions hosted by Canada